Morris Bradshaw (born October 19, 1952) is a former American football player. He played wide receiver mainly for the Oakland Raiders.

The Raiders selected Bradshaw in the 4th round of the 1974 NFL Draft out of Ohio State. He played in 104 games with 26 starts and caught 84 passes for 1,305 yards and 11 touchdowns. Bradshaw was a member of the Raiders Super Bowl XI and XV championship squads.

Morris went on to play one season with the Patriots. He had 6 receptions for 111 yards and 1 touchdown for the New England Patriots in 8 games during the 1982 regular season. His longest reception for the Patriots was 48 yards in their 16-0 shutout of the Seahawks at the Kingdome on December 19, 1982. He also recovered his own fumble in this game.

His only touchdown reception as a Patriot wide receiver was an 11-yard pass from Steve Grogan, with 11 seconds left in the 1st half, in their 30–19 victory over the Buffalo Bills at Schaefer Stadium on January 2, 1983, thereby allowing them to make the playoffs.

1952 births
Living people
American football wide receivers
Oakland Raiders players
Ohio State Buckeyes football players
Ohio State University alumni
New England Patriots players
People from Highland, Illinois
Players of American football from Illinois